Vanmeekanathar Temple, Tiruneipperu is a Siva temple in Tiruvarur district in Tamil Nadu (India). This place is also known as Adiyar Temple. It is at  distance of 8 km in Tiruvarur-Thiruthuraipoondi Road The temple can be reached just opposite to Nami Nandi Adigal temple.

Vaippu Sthalam
It is one of the shrines of the Vaippu Sthalams sung by Tamil Saivite Nayanar Appar. This place is also known as Emapperur.

Presiding deity
The presiding deity in the garbhagriha, represented by the lingam, is known as Vanmeekanathar. His consort is known as Umaparameswari.  This was the birthplace of Nami Nandi Adigal.

Shrines
In the Prakaram shrines of Vinayaka, Subramania, Bairava, Sanisvara and Surya are found. In the front mandapa
the shrine of the goddess is found.

Kumbhabhishekham
The Kumbhabhishekham of the temple was held on 30 March 2018.

References

 

Shiva temples in Tiruvarur district